Saturday Live (retitled Friday Night Live for the 1988 series and 2022 one-off special) is a British television comedy and music show, made by LWT and initially broadcast on Channel 4 from 1985 to 1988, with a brief revival on ITV in 1996. A few one-off editions have also been screened sporadically, including a contribution to the BBC's 1993 Comic Relief telethon. It was based on the American sketch comedy show Saturday Night Live but otherwise had no direct connection to the show.

The series made stars of Ben Elton and Harry Enfield, and featured appearances (in some cases first television appearances) by Stephen Fry and Hugh Laurie, Patrick Marber, Morwenna Banks, Chris Barrie, Julian Clary, Emo Philips, Tracey Ullman, Craig Ferguson, Craig Charles and many others. The pilot show and first series featured comic duo Adrian Edmondson and Rik Mayall in their act The Dangerous Brothers each week. The introductory theme was an original composition by Paul Hardcastle.

History
All episodes were transmitted live but contained a small proportion of material recorded beforehand. Recordings of shows were edited into compilation repeats, titled Saturday Almost Live.

The third series, Friday Night Live, renamed to reflect its scheduling move to the titular day, is the last of the programme's original iteration. A shorter and slightly tighter-formatted show, it retained Elton as regular host. The show's title sequence consisted of re-forming clay animations, highly comparable to early MTV idents.

The show was resurrected as a segment for 1993's Red Nose Day BBC telethon, hosted by Ben Elton, with appearances by Reeves and Mortimer, Eddie Izzard, Hugh Laurie, and Newman & Baddiel.

The show made a return in 1996 on ITV, regaining a Saturday slot and retitled accordingly. Hosted by Lee Hurst, it featured comedians including Harry Hill and Simon Munnery. The series lasted eight episodes before being axed.

On 1 December 2007, the programme was revived by ITV for a one-off titled Saturday Live Again, presented by Marcus Brigstocke. Comedians included Jimmy Carr, Lee Mack, Mitchell and Webb, and Jocelyn Jee Esien. The original show's regular host Ben Elton also performed. There were musical performances by Bon Jovi and Hard-Fi.

In August 2022, it was announced the programme was being revived for a one-off special, as part of Channel 4's 40th-anniversary celebrations, and would again be hosted by Ben Elton. The special aired on 21 October 2022. The special gained notoriety for a musical performance in which transgender comedian Jordan Gray stripped nude to a live audience.

Home releases
A compilation double DVD set, Saturday Live: The Best of Series One, was released on 16 April 2007, containing almost two-and-a-half hours of material. No music performances from the shows were included. Saturday Live: The Best of Series 2 was released on 4 February 2008, and The Very Best Of Friday Night Live was released on 2 June 2008. On 5 October 2009, a fourth release, a 3-disc set collecting all the show's Fry & Laurie and Harry Enfield sketches and the best Ben Elton monologues, was released.

Transmissions

Series

Specials

See also
 The Comic Strip
 Saturday Night Live

References

External links 
 
 
 
 
 BFI.org.uk - transmission information for Saturday Live and Friday Night Live

1985 British television series debuts
2022 British television series endings
1980s British comedy television series
1990s British comedy television series
2000s British comedy television series
2020s British comedy television series
BBC Television shows
1980s British music television series
1990s British music television series
2000s British music television series
2020s British music television series
British television series based on American television series
Channel 4 comedy
ITV comedy
British stand-up comedy television series
English-language television shows
London Weekend Television shows
Television series by ITV Studios
British television series revived after cancellation